Rotan High School is a public high school located in Rotan, Texas (USA) and classified as a 1A school by the UIL. It is part of the Rotan Independent School District located in southern Fisher County. In 2015, the school was rated "Met Standard" by the Texas Education Agency.

Athletics
The Rotan Yellowhammers compete in these sports - 

Baseball
Basketball
Cross Country
6-man Football
Softball
Tennis
Track and Field
Volleyball

State titles
Football - 
1962(1A)
Boys Track - 
1962(1A), 1989(1A)

References

External links
Rotan ISD

Public high schools in Texas
Schools in Fisher County, Texas